The Order of the First President of Kazakhstan – Leader of the Nation Nursultan Nazarbayev, also referred to simply as the Order of Nazarbayev, is a state award of the Republic of Kazakhstan. It was established on 1 January 2001 in honor of President Nursultan Nazarbayev who was at the time, the first and only President of Kazakhstan.

It is awarded to Kazakh and foreign citizens for contributions to the development and prosperity of the country. This includes any of the following actions:

 Participation in social activities
 Achievements in sport and other competition on behalf of Kazakhstan
 Contributions to the development of a strong economy
 Distinguished service in national law enforcement and military bodies

The order changed its design four times since its inception, from the sign on the cervical tape to the mark on the shoulder ribbon with the star.

List of recipients 
 Kassym-Jomart Tokayev (2004)
 Vladimir Putin (2019)
 Sooronbay Jeenbekov (2019)
 Alexander Lukashenko (2019)
 Nurlan Nigmatulin (2015)
 Imangali Tasmagambetov (2004)
 Abish Kekilbayev (2004)
Vladimir Shkolnik
Gennady Golovkin
 Talgat Musabayev
 Baktykozha Izmukhambetov
 Viktor Khrapunov
 Bulat Utemuratov
 Karim Massimov
 Daniyal Akhmetov

Gallery

See also
Orders, decorations, and medals of Kazakhstan

References 

2001 establishments in Kazakhstan
Orders, decorations, and medals of Kazakhstan
Nursultan Nazarbayev